David Lee Wilson (born January 8, 1950) is an American politician and a Republican member of the Delaware Senate, where he has represented the 18th district since 2019. He was previously a member of the Delaware House of Representatives from 2008 to 2018.

Electoral history
In 2008, Wilson ran for the seat vacated by retiring Republican J. Benjamin Ewing, and won the general election with 5,174 votes (61%) against Democratic nominee L. Aaron Chaffinch.
In 2010, Wilson won the general election with 4,719 votes (70.3%) against Democratic nominee James Westhoff.
In 2012, Wilson won the general election with 5,836 votes (92.6%) against Libertarian candidate Ronnie Fitzgerald.
In 2014, Wilson was unopposed in the general election, winning 4,155 votes.
In 2016, Wilson won the Republican primary with 1,252 votes (69.2%) against Robert Mitchel. He went on to win the general election with 6,553 (72.9%) against Democratic nominee Gary Wolfe.
In 2018, Wilson ran for an open seat in the Delaware Senate, and won the general election with 10,816 (65.2%) against Democratic nominee James Purcell.

References

External links
Official page at the Delaware General Assembly
Campaign site
 

1950 births
Living people
Republican Party members of the Delaware House of Representatives
People from Sussex County, Delaware
21st-century American politicians